Science for the People (formerly Skeptically Speaking) is an Edmonton-based, weekly podcast and radio show that aims to explore issues pertaining to science, skepticism and rational thinking through interviews. The show has featured interviews with prominent skeptics, researchers, and scientists including Adam Savage, Derek Colanduno, Phil Plait, and Carl Zimmer.

Production
Science for the People is hosted by Desiree Schell, and produced by Rachelle Saunders. The show's theme song is by Edmonton band Fractal Pattern, and is called "Binary Consequence".

The podcast's first episode, on the subject of the secular movement in Alberta, was broadcast on the 20th of March 2009. Since then, a show has been offered every week. The live show broadcasts every Sunday at 6PM and invites its listeners to contribute their questions either via email, phone call, or by posting in the live chat-room during the shows. While its home station is the campus-based CJSR-FM, the show is now broadcast by a number of stations in Canada and in the United States.

Recurrent features
In addition to the main interviews in the show, a short segment is often offered during which members of the skeptical communities are invited to publicize their various projects, allowing for the promotion of grassroots events.
Another such short segment is called "everything you know is sort of wrong" and invites science blogger Greg Laden to clarify scientific misconceptions that might be held by the public.

References

External links
 

Mass media in Edmonton
Scientific skepticism mass media
Audio podcasts
2009 podcast debuts